Battle Cattle is a light-hearted combat board game published by Wingnut Games in 1997.

Publication history
In 1997, Wingnut Games published a Battle Royale miniatures game called Battle Cattle in which players rolled up statistics for warrior cows armed with weapons, and then engaged each other in combat.

In 2001, Steve Jackson Games turned the miniatures game into a card game called Battle Cattle: The Card Game.

Gameplay
Players first choose a breed of cow from a list, then generate statistics for the cow to determine Health Points, Weight Allowances, and Tipping Defence numbers. Players can then choose offensive and defensive accessories. After combat starts, the last cow remaining is the winner.

Reception
In the January 1997 edition of Dragon (Issue 237), Rick Swan found the game enjoyable, saying, "Despite the udderly stupid premise, it’s a credible miniatures game, albeit one that’s easy to win if you choose the right accessories."

Reviews
Valkyrie #14 (1997)
Shadis #32 (1996)
Backstab (Issue 3 - May/Jun 1997)

References

Board games introduced in 1997